Alexander Ivanovich Bastrykin (born August 27, 1953, in Pskov) is a Russian official, former First Deputy Prosecutor General of Russia, and former Chairman of The Investigative Committee of the Prosecutor General's Office. Since January 15, 2011, he is the head of the Investigative Committee of Russia.

Biography 
Alexander Bastrykin graduated from the Law Department of Leningrad State University in 1975, and was a university classmate of Vladimir Putin.

In 2007, President Vladimir Putin established the Investigative Committee of the Prosecutor General's Office, de facto independent from the Prosecutor General's Office, and Bastrykin became its first chairman. The appointment was reportedly instigated by Igor Sechin, wishing to retain his influence after the dismissal of his close ally Vladimir Ustinov from the position of prosecutor general in 2006.

On November 28, 2009, as head of the Investigative Committee at the scene of the 2009 Nevsky Express bombing, Bastrykin was injured by a second bomb and was hospitalised. The second bomb was reportedly targeted at investigators, and was detonated by mobile phone.

Bastrykin is considered to be an intimate advisor of President Putin.

In July 2022, amid the 2022 Russian invasion of Ukraine, he announced that the Investigative Committee had opened 1300 criminal investigations against Ukrainian prisoners of war, saying that 92 of them had already been charged with crimes against humanity. The announcement drew criticism from human rights experts, with Amnesty International saying that the Russian government "shared no evidence to support these charges" and that "willfully depriving a prisoner of war of fair trial rights constitutes a war crime."

Controversies

Plagiarism 
Bastrykin holds a doctor of law degree, and has published more than 100 scholarly works in Russia.

In 2007 Bastrykin was publicly accused of plagiarism, because parts of his then new book "Signs of the Hand. Dactyloscopy" (2004) had been rewritten from the famous book of German writer Jürgen Thorwald.

In 2013 these accusations were confirmed and supplemented by Dissernet community and its founder Sergei Parkhomenko: it was found that Bastrykin's book also contains an entire chapter from the book by Anthony Summers "The Secret Life of J. Edgar Hoover" (in Russian translation "The FBI Empire – Myths, Secrets, Intrigues").

Sanctions and blacklistings 
On January 9, 2017, under the Magnitsky Act, the United States Treasury's Office of Foreign Assets Control updated its Specially Designated Nationals List and blacklisted Aleksandr I. Bastrykin, Andrei K. Lugovoi, Dmitri V. Kovtun, Stanislav Gordievsky, and Gennady Plaksin, which froze any of their assets held by American financial institutions or transactions with those institutions and banned their travelling to the United States.

On the 6th of July 2020, the government of the United Kingdom imposed sanctions on Bastrykin as part of a move to sanction a number of Russians and Saudis for having 'blood on their hands'.

Secret residence permit and real estate in the Czech Republic 
On 26 July 2012 Russian blogger and anticorruption activist Alexey Navalny published documents indicating that Bastrykin had a residence permit and owned real estate in the Czech Republic.  Mr. Navalny wrote that the real estate holding and residence permit in a country belonging to NATO, a military alliance opposed to Russia, should raise questions about Mr. Bastrykin's security clearance for work in law enforcement and access to state secrets.

Threatening journalists
According to Dmitry Muratov, Bastrykin threatened the life of newspaper editor Sergei Sokolov, and jokingly assured him that he would investigate the murder himself.

2022 war censorship laws
In March 2022, Russian journalist Alexander Nevzorov wrote to Bastrykin that Russia's 2022 war censorship laws, which introduced prison sentences of up to 15 years for those who publish "knowingly false information" about the Russian military and its operations, violate the freedom of speech provisions of the Constitution of Russia.

Political views and legislative initiatives 
In 2015, Bastrykin proposed to amend article 15 of the Constitution of Russia by establishing the priority of national laws over universally recognized principles and norms of international law and international agreements ratified by Russian Federation (it is possible only through the adoption of the new Constitution because article 15 appears in chapter 1, established the fundamental principles of the constitutional order).

In 2016, Bastrykin expressed the need to establish official national ideology and censor the Internet, on the grounds that there is information warfare against Russia launched by USA and its allies. As such proposals clash with the provisions of chapters 1 and 2 of the Constitution of Russia, established the fundamental principles of the constitutional order and the fundamental rights of citizens, the complaint was lodged against Bastrykin with the General Prosecutor's Office of Russian Federation but General Prosecutor's Office refused to initiate an investigation.

Honors and awards
Order for Merit to the Fatherland, 2nd and 4th class
Order of Alexander Nevsky
Order of Honor
Medal "In Commemoration of the 300th Anniversary of Saint Petersburg"
Medal of Anatoly Koni (Ministry of Justice)
Medal in Commemoration of the 200th Anniversary of the Ministry of Justice
Medals "For Diligence" 1st and 2nd classes (Ministry of Justice)
Russian Federation Presidential Certificate of Honor (2009)
Honorary Title of Honored Jurist of the Russian Federation
Order of Friendship (Armenia, 2016)
Order of Honor (Ingushetia, 2013)
Order of Honor (South Ossetia, 2009)

References

External links 

 Michael Weiss. The Rise and Probable Fall of Putin's Enforcer //  The Atlantic,  Aug 12 2013

1953 births
Living people
Russian jurists
Russian prosecutors
Saint Petersburg State University alumni
20th-century Russian lawyers
21st-century Russian lawyers
20th-century Russian politicians
21st-century Russian politicians
People sanctioned under the Magnitsky Act